Asif Musazai (born 1 September 2003) is an Afghan cricketer. He made his first-class debut for Band-e-Amir Region in the 2017–18 Ahmad Shah Abdali 4-day Tournament on 7 November 2017. In May 2018, during the final of the 2018 Ahmad Shah Abdali 4-day Tournament, he scored a century in the first innings for Band-e-Amir Region against Amo Region. He made his Twenty20 debut on 8 October 2019, for Speen Ghar Tigers in the 2019 Shpageeza Cricket League.

In December 2019, he was named in Afghanistan's squad for the 2020 Under-19 Cricket World Cup. He made his List A debut on 19 October 2020, for Band-e-Amir Region in the 2020 Ghazi Amanullah Khan Regional One Day Tournament.

References

External links
 

2003 births
Living people
Afghan cricketers
Band-e-Amir Dragons cricketers
Place of birth missing (living people)